Andre Agassi defeated Tommy Haas in the final, 6–3, 6–3, 6–0 to win the men's singles tennis title at the 2002 Italian Open.

Juan Carlos Ferrero was the defending champion, but lost in the second round to Ivan Ljubičić.

Seeds

  Lleyton Hewitt (second round)
  Gustavo Kuerten (second round)
  Juan Carlos Ferrero (second round)
  Yevgeny Kafelnikov (second round)
  Tim Henman (first round)
  Marat Safin (second round)
  Tommy Haas (final)
  Thomas Johansson (first round)
  Andre Agassi (champion)
  Sébastien Grosjean (third round)
  Roger Federer (first round)
  Pete Sampras (first round)
  Andy Roddick (semifinals)
  Jiří Novák (semifinals)
  Guillermo Cañas (first round)
  Àlex Corretja (first round)

Draw

Finals

Top half

Section 1

Section 2

Bottom half

Section 3

Section 4

Qualifying

Qualifying seeds

Qualifiers

Qualifying draw

First qualifier

Second qualifier

Third qualifier

Fourth qualifier

Fifth qualifier

Sixth qualifier

Seventh qualifier

Eighth qualifier

References

External links
 ITF tournament profile
 Main draw (ATP)
 Qualifying draw (ATP)

Men's Singles
Italian Open - Singles